Sainik Express is an Express train of the Indian Railways connecting  in Rajasthan and  of Delhi. It is currently being operated with 14021/14022 train numbers on three in a week basis.

The name of this train derives from the Hindi word Sainik which refers to the army.

History
This train was inaugurated as Delhi Sarai Rohilla–Sikar Express on 21 June 2017 by the Railway Minister of India during the completion of conversion of Sikar–Loharu railway line into  broad gauge.

Later on 1 March 2019, it was extended to Ringas Junction after the demand of Passengers for Direct train to Delhi and given name as Sainik Express.

Service
This train covers the distance of  average time of this train is 10 hours and 2 minutes with an average speed of 40 km/h.

Route

Coach composition

The train consists of 13 coaches:

 1 AC III Tier
 4 Sleeper coaches
 3 Second Class sitting
 4 General
 2 Second-class Luggage/parcel van

See also 

 Sikar railway station
 Delhi Sarai Rohilla railway station

Notes

External links 

 14021/Sainik Express India Rail Info
 14022/Sainik Express India Rail Info

References 

Rail transport in Delhi
Rail transport in Haryana
Rail transport in Rajasthan
Transport in Delhi
Express trains in India
Railway services introduced in 2017
2017 establishments in India
Named passenger trains of India